Mika Kojonkoski (born April 19, 1964 in Rauma, Finland) is a Finnish ski jumping coach and politician. Kojonkoski was a ski jumper himself in the 1980s, but he never reached the level of the best Finnish jumpers like Matti Nykänen. His best result was his 9th place in Chamonix, he also achieved a 16th place in the 1985 Ski flying World Championships in Planica.

Kojonkoski quickly became a known figure as a ski coach. After starting up as coach of Finland's junior team, Kojonkoski was hired as the new Austrian coach in 1997. He returned home to Finland to take over the national team in 1999, before he took over the Norwegian team in 2002 where he helped create stars like Sigurd Pettersen, Lars Bystøl, Bjørn Einar Romøren, Anders Jacobsen and Tom Hilde.

Kojonkoski is an active politician in his hometown of Kuopio, where he represents the National Coalition Party.

Personal life 

Mika has three children with his wife Ulla.

National teams coached

References

1963 births
Living people
People from Rauma, Finland
Finnish male ski jumpers
Finnish ski jumping coaches
National Coalition Party politicians